Calbo may refer to:

Bernat Calbó (or Calvó) (c. 1180–1243), sometimes called Bernard of Calvo, a Catalan jurist, bureaucrat, monk, bishop, and soldier
Calbo (rapper), French rapper of Guinean origin. Also member of rap duo Ärsenik
Calbo family, later on Calbo-Crotta, mercantile family originating from Padua and then established in Venice starting the year 891

See also
Calbovista, a fungal genus
Carbo (disambiguation)